Prunus setulosa (bristle cherry) is a species of cherry found in Gansu, Guizhou, Hubei, Ningxia, Qinghai, Shaanxi and Sichuan provinces of China. A shrub or small tree 1.5 to 5m tall, it prefers to grow in forests or thickets in mountain ravines between 1300 and 2,600m above sea level. Its leaves are eaten by the gray snub-nosed monkey Rhinopithecus brelichi. Its inflorescences are umbels with two or three flowers. The sepals are leaf-like, and the petals are pink. There are 30 to 40 stamens. It blooms April through June and bears red fruits June through August.

References

setulosa
Cherries
Endemic flora of China
Flora of Qinghai
Flora of North-Central China
Flora of South-Central China
Flora of Ningxia
Plants described in 1892